Nima (Mandarin: 尼玛镇) is a town in Maqu County, Gannan Tibetan Autonomous Prefecture, Gansu, China. In 2010, Nima had a total population of 17,820: 9,936 males and 7,884 females: 3,910 aged under 14, 13,276 aged between 15 and 65 and 634 aged over 65.

References 

Township-level divisions of Gansu
Gannan Tibetan Autonomous Prefecture